The World Group was the highest level of Fed Cup competition in 2008. Eight nations competed in a three-round knockout competition. Russia was the defending champion, and they succeeded in defending their title by defeating Spain in the final, 4–0.

Participating Teams

Draw

Quarterfinals

Russia vs. Israel

Germany vs. United States

France vs. China

Spain vs. Italy

Semifinals

Russia vs. United States

China vs. Spain

Final

Russia vs. Spain

References

See also
Fed Cup structure

World